The Chinese Nail Murders is a gong'an detective novel written by Robert van Gulik and set in Imperial China (roughly speaking the Tang Dynasty). It is a fiction based on the real character of Judge Dee (Ti Jen-chieh or Di Renjie), a magistrate and statesman of the Tang court, who lived roughly 630–700 BC.

Plot introduction
Judge Dee, and his four helpers, solve three murders: that of an honored merchant, a master of martial arts, and the wife of a merchant, whose corpse has no head. Judge Dee soon comes under pressure from higher-ranking officials to end his investigation. Naturally, Judge Dee refuses to give up until he has learned the whole truth.

A nail murder was a motif of crime in ancient China.

The case of the headless corpse was based on an actual 13th-century Chinese murder casebook.

References 

1961 novels
Judge Dee
Gong'an novels
Harper & Row books
Novels set in the 7th century
Novels set in the Tang dynasty
Michael Joseph books